"O rosa bella" is the title of two popular 15th century chansons, the earlier composed by Johannes Ciconia and the latter originally attributed to John Dunstaple, but now to John Bedyngham . The text is based on a poem written by Leonardo Giustiniani (1388–1446).

The text of the first verse is:

O rosa bella,
O dolce anima mia
Non mi lassar morire
In cortesia, in cortesia.

Stanley Sadie in the Cambridge Music Guide gives as translation:

O lovely rose
My sweet soul
Let me not die
In courtly love

The chanson was used as a basis for several other works, including that by Johannes Ockeghem, and masses attributed to Gilles Joye; however, Johannes Ciconia's early version shares the words but not the tune .

Recordings
 O rosa bella: English and Continental Music from the Late Gothic Period: Clemencic Consort / René Clemencic (Arte Nova 59210)

References

External links
 Midi and nwc2 versions with text on the ChoralWiki site.
 Enzyklopædia super O rosa bella by composer Karlheinz Essl (1995)

Renaissance chansons
Medieval compositions